Castle Peak is the ninth highest summit of the Rocky Mountains of North America and the U.S. state of Colorado. The prominent  fourteener is the highest summit of the Elk Mountains and the Maroon Bells-Snowmass Wilderness. The summit of Castle Peak is the highest point of both counties.

Mountain
Castle Peak takes its name from its castellated summit. The best climbing months are June, July, August, September through the Montezuma Glacier, a permanent snowfield between Castle and Conundrum Peaks. There are two standard routes for ascent. The Northwest Ridge features a moderate snow climb followed by an easy ridge scramble. The Northeast Ridge features an easy snow climb, but slightly harder scrambling and route-finding once on the ridge.

with an elevation 11,280+ feet, (3438+ m);
with an elevation of 8,140 feet (2,481 m).

Conundrum Peak is a northern subsummit of Castle Peak. It has two closely spaced summits; the northern is higher, with elevation of 14,040+ feet (4279+ m).
This does not meet the usual  prominence criterion for an officially separate peak; however, it is often climbed in conjunction with Castle Peak.

See also

List of mountain peaks of North America
List of mountain peaks of the United States
List of mountain peaks of Colorado
List of Colorado county high points
List of Colorado fourteeners

Notes

References

External links

 
 
 
 
 
 

Mountains of Colorado
Mountains of Pitkin County, Colorado
Mountains of Gunnison County, Colorado
White River National Forest
Fourteeners of Colorado
North American 4000 m summits